Laura Choinet (born 25 September 1984) is a French badminton player.

Achievements

BWF International Challenge/Series 
Women's doubles

Mixed doubles

  BWF International Challenge tournament
  BWF International Series tournament

References

External links 
 

1984 births
Living people
French female badminton players
21st-century French women